State Route 320 (SR 320) is a  north-south state highway in the northeastern part of the U.S. state of Georgia. It is located in rural areas, almost all of it in Franklin County, and a very small segment in Stephens County.

Route description
SR 320 begins at an intersection with SR 59 (Commerce Road), just southwest of Carnesville, in Franklin County. The route travels northwest, skirting along the southwestern edge of Carnesville, to an interchange with Interstate 85 (I-85, Ernest Vandiver Highway). After the interchange, the route continues northwest, and curves over Whiten Creek to the north, through generally rural areas of the county before reaching its northern terminus just inside the Stephens County, an intersection with SR 106 in Mize.

SR 320 is not part of the National Highway System, a system of roadways important to the nation's economy, defense, and mobility.

History

Major intersections

See also

References

External links

320
Transportation in Franklin County, Georgia
Transportation in Stephens County, Georgia